Parapodisma is a genus of spur-throated grasshoppers in the family Acrididae. There are about 12 described species in Parapodisma, found in Japan, China, and South Korea.

Species
These 12 species belong to the genus Parapodisma:

 Parapodisma astris Huang, 2006  (China)
 Parapodisma awagatakensis Ishikawa, 1998  (Japan)
 Parapodisma caelestis Tominaga & Ishikawa, 2001  (Japan)
 Parapodisma dairisama (Scudder, 1897)  (Japan)
 Parapodisma etsukoana Kobayashi, 1986  (Japan)
 Parapodisma mikado (Bolívar, 1890)  (Japan)
 Parapodisma niihamensis Inoue, 1979  (Japan)
 Parapodisma setouchiensis Inoue, 1979  (Japan and South Korea)
 Parapodisma subastris Huang, 1983  (Japan)
 Parapodisma takeii (Takei, 1914)  (Japan)
 Parapodisma tenryuensis Kobayashi, 1983  (Japan)
 Parapodisma yasumatsui Yamasaki, 1980  (Japan)

References

External links

 

Acrididae